is a town located in Kimotsuki District, Kagoshima Prefecture, Japan.

The town was formed on March 22, 2005 from the merger of the towns of Ōnejime and Tashiro, both from Kimotsuki District.

As of July 2010, the town has an estimated population of 9,328. The total area is 163.15 km².

Geography

Climate
Kinkō has a humid subtropical climate (Köppen climate classification Cfa) with hot summers and mild winters. Precipitation is significant throughout the year, and is heavier in summer, especially the months of June and July.

Demographics
Per Japanese census data, the population of Kinkō in 2020 is 6,944 people. Kinkō began the census in 1920, and the town's population peaked in the 1950s at more than 22,000 people; the population has continued to decline since then. After the 2010s, Kinkō's population has fallen below 10,000.

References

External links

Kinkō official website 

Towns in Kagoshima Prefecture
Populated places established in 2005
2005 establishments in Japan